Barilius dogarsinghi is a fish in the genus Barilius of the family Cyprinidae. It is found in Manipur, India.

References 

D
Fish of India
Fish described in 1921